The 2018 Alpha Energy Solutions 250 was the 4th stock car race of the 2018 NASCAR Camping World Truck Series, and the 24th iteration of the event. The race was originally held on Saturday, March 24, 2018 but after 24 laps, rain and snow postponed the race until Monday, March 26, 2021. The race was held in Martinsville, Virginia at Martinsville Speedway. The race took the scheduled 250 laps to complete. John Hunter Nemechek, driving a part-time schedule for NEMCO Motorsports would win the race after holding off Kyle Benjamin on a late-race restart, garnering the 6th win of his career and the first of the season.

The race was the NASCAR Camping World Truck Series debut for Tyler Matthews, Cory Roper, and Reid Wilson.

Background 

Martinsville Speedway is an NASCAR-owned stock car racing track located in Henry County, in Ridgeway, Virginia, just to the south of Martinsville. At 0.526 miles (0.847 km) in length, it is the shortest track in the NASCAR Cup Series. The track was also one of the first paved oval tracks in NASCAR, being built in 1947 by H. Clay Earles. It is also the only remaining race track that has been on the NASCAR circuit from its beginning in 1948.

Entry list 

*Withdrew.

Practice

First practice 
First practice was held on Friday, March 23, at 11:05 AM EST.

Second practice 
Second practice was held on Friday, March 23, at 1:05 PM EST.

Third and final practice 
Third and final practice was held on Friday, March 23, at 3:05 PM EST.

Qualifying 
Qualifying was held on Saturday, March 24, at 11:05 AM EST. Since Martinsville Speedway is a short track, the qualifying system was a multi-car system that included three rounds. The first round was 15 minutes, where every driver would be able to set a lap within the 15 minutes. Then, the second round would consist of the fastest 24 cars in Round 1, and drivers would have 10 minutes to set a lap. Round 3 consisted of the fastest 12 drivers from Round 2, and the drivers would have 5 minutes to set a time. Whoever was fastest in Round 3 would win the pole.

While Mike Harmon would not set the slowest time (Mike Senica would set the slowest, being a over a second slower than Harmon), Harmon would not have enough owner points to qualify, making Harmon the only driver to fail to qualify for the race.

Race results 
Stage 1 Laps: 70

Stage 2 Laps: 70

Stage 3 Laps: 110

References 

2018 NASCAR Camping World Truck Series
NASCAR races at Martinsville Speedway
March 2018 sports events in the United States
2018 in sports in Virginia